Steven Da Rui (born 21 March 1964) is a former Australian rules footballer who played with Carlton in the Victorian/Australian Football League (VFL/AFL).

Da Rui, the son of Italian immigrants, played his early football at St Marks before joining WAFL club East Perth. Although used mainly as a half back flanker, he had perhaps his best season in 1986 when he played as a ruck-rover.

He was picked up by Carlton for the 1987 season but didn't feature in the seniors, instead spending the year in the reserves and winning a premiership. Da Rui became a regular in Carlton's VFL team in 1988 and participated in 20 games, including three finals. In the preliminary final, he was involved in an incident with Steven O'Dwyer which saw the Melbourne player miss the grand final through suspension. He represented Western Australia in their 1990 State of Origin match against Victoria.

References

1964 births
Carlton Football Club players
East Perth Football Club players
Western Australian State of Origin players
Australian people of Italian descent
Living people
Australian rules footballers from Western Australia